Todd McKee (born November 7, 1963) is an American actor. He is best known for his roles as Ted Capwell on the NBC soap opera Santa Barbara and as Jake Maclaine on the CBS soap opera The Bold and the Beautiful.  In the late 1990s, McKee began a career as a financial adviser for Merrill Lynch.

Filmography

Television series

Film

Awards and nominations

References

External links

1963 births
Living people
American male television actors
American male soap opera actors
People from Kentfield, California